"Baby" is a song performed by English DJ and producer Anton Powers and English singer Pixie Lott. The song was released in the United Kingdom as a digital download on 31 March 2017 through 3Beat Productions. The song peaked at number 97 on the UK Singles Chart and number 28 on the Scottish Singles Chart.

Background
Talking about the single, Pixie said, "it feels like a new chapter for me. I had a lot of fun working with Anton on Baby. We first met years ago when he remixed my song "Gravity" but we bumped into each other in Ibiza last Summer and I knew he was someone I wanted to work with again."

Live performances
Anton Powers and Pixie Lott gave their first live performance of the song on The Voice UK Final on 1 April 2017. Powers and Lott also performed the song on All Round to Mrs. Brown's on 8 April 2017.

Music video
A music video to accompany the release of "Baby" was first released onto YouTube on 14 April 2017 at a total length of three minutes and nineteen seconds.

Track listing

Charts

Certifications

Release history

References

2017 songs
2017 singles
Anton Powers songs
Pixie Lott songs
3 Beat Records singles